Ice Devils Sofia (Bulg. Хокеен Клуб "Ледени Дяволи" or Ledenite Dyavoli Sofia) is a Bulgarian ice hockey club, from Sofia. They played one season (2007–08) in the Bulgarian Hockey League. The club is playing in the second-highest ice hockey league of Bulgaria, the Balkan Amateur Hockey League (BaHL).

History 
The club was founded in 2007 and joined Group B of the Bulgarian Hockey League for the 2007-08 season. They finished with a record of four wins, one overtime win, and one loss, which was good enough for first place in their group. Ledenite participated in the Balkan League for the 2008-09 season, finishing in second place behind HC Etro 92 Veliko Tarnovo. In the 2009-10 season, they finished in second place in the regular season and lost in the playoff finals to Thessaloniki. The club finished first in the regular season in 2010-11, but were knocked out in the playoffs semifinals. During the 2011-12 season, Ledenite finished in fourth place in the regular season and lost in the third place game to Red Star Sofia. They finished in second place in Group A of the Balkan League in 2012-13.

Results 
The "Ice Devils" were able to win their first BaHL Championship in the season 2013-14.

Team 

Squad

External links
https://www.facebook.com/icedevils.sofia
Team profile on eurohockey.net

References 

 http://www.eurohockey.com/club/6799-ice-devils-sofia.html
 https://www.facebook.com/icedevils.sofia/info

Ice hockey teams in Bulgaria
Bulgarian Hockey League teams